Mitra mitra, common name the episcopal miter, is a species of large predatory sea snail, a marine gastropod mollusk in the family Mitridae, the miters.

Distribution
Widespread in the Indo-Pacific, from East Africa, including Madagascar and the Red Sea, to eastern Polynesia. North to southern Japan, Wake Island and Hawaii, and south to Australia.

Habitat
This species lives in intertidal and sublittoral zones, to a depth of around 80 m.

Feeding
Mitra mitra is known to be carnivorous, an active predator that feeds on smaller gastropods and bivalves.

Shell description
The maximum shell length for this species is 18 cm, usually to 14 cm.
Like in all Mitridae, the shell is elongate, somewhat fusiform, with a high spire. The aperture is elongate and narrow, and the outer lip is smooth and not lirate (grooved). Unlike other species of the genus Mitra, the spire is not strongly shouldered. The surface of the shell is smooth, with a few weak, spiral grooves towards the anterior end. The colour is white, with spiral rows of large irregular orange or red spots.

References

Further reading 
 Cosel R. V. (1977). "First record of Mitra mitra (Linnaeus, 1758) (Gastropoda: Prosobranchia) on the Pacific coast of Colombia". Veliger 19: 422-424.

External links

 
 

Mitridae
Gastropods described in 1758
Taxa named by Carl Linnaeus